Pepler Sacto Emiliano Sandri ("Pepler") is a South African cricketer, who has played cricket for Boland, Cape Cobras and Sussex.

He signed for Sussex on a one-year at the start of the 2009 season. In June 2009 he took three top-order wickets for Sussex against the touring Australian team at Hove.

References

1983 births
Living people
South African cricketers
Boland cricketers
Cape Cobras cricketers
Sussex cricketers
South African people of Italian descent